The 2001 WNBA season was the 5th season for the Sacramento Monarchs. The team won their first playoff series, but they were later defeated by eventual champion Los Angeles Sparks in the conference finals.

Offseason

WNBA Draft

Regular season

Season standings

Season schedule

Playoffs

Player stats

References

Sacramento Monarchs seasons
Sacramento
Sacramento Monarchs